Ta Phraya National Park is a protected area at the eastern end of the Sankamphaeng Range in the area where these mountains meet the Dangrek Range, near the Thai-Cambodian border. It is largely in Ta Phraya District, Sa Kaeo Province, district after which it is named, although the park also includes sectors of Ban Kruat, Non Din Daeng, and Lahan Sai Districts of Buriram Province. The park, with an area of 371,250 rai ~  is east of Pang Sida National Park. It was established in 1996.

Elevations range between 206 and 579 m. The highest mountain is Khao Pran Nut (ยอดเขาพรานนุช). There are also some ancient Khmer temple ruins in the park area such as Prasat Khao Lon.

Between the 1970s and the 1990s there were refugee camps for Cambodians in this part of the border zone.

Climate
The weather usually influenced by southwestern monsoon and northeastern monsoon. In the southwestern monsoon from May to October, there are high humidity winds blowing from the Andaman Sea and the Gulf of Thailand causing rain, about 1,000–1,400 mm per year. The weather consists of three seasons: summer from February to April; rain from May to October; winter from November to January. Average temperature is 39.8° Celsius and the lowest temperature is 14.3° Celsius.

Flora and fauna
The forested areas of the park include mixed deciduous forest, dry evergreen forest, and deciduous dipterocarp forest.

The fauna of the park includes the sambar deer, mouse deer, common muntjac, Asian black bear, sun bear, serow, langur, gibbon, palm civet, fishing cat, banteng, gaur and the Siamese hare, as well as the azure-winged magpie, the scarlet minivet, and the long-tailed minivet.

Ta Phraya is also home to the endangered Siamese rosewood, a tree species that is being extracted illegally for sale in especially the Chinese furniture market. Armed poachers are coming across the border from Cambodia, and rangers are since 2015 trained in military style counter-poaching measures

See also
List of protected areas of Thailand
List of Protected Areas Regional Offices of Thailand

References

External links

Ta Phraya National Park, Royal Forest Department (Thai)

National parks of Thailand
Protected areas established in 1996
Dângrêk Mountains
Tourist attractions in Buriram province
Tourist attractions in Sa Kaeo province
1996 establishments in Thailand
Sankamphaeng Range